Stuart Baird (born 14 January 1947) is an English film editor, producer, and director who is mainly associated with action films. He has edited over thirty major motion pictures.

Life and career
Baird has had an extended collaboration with director Richard Donner. For Baird's work on Superman in 1978, he was nominated for the Academy Award for Film Editing. He received another nomination for editing Gorillas in the Mist (1988). Prior to his working relationship with Richard Donner, Baird worked as assistant director and assistant editor on different projects before editing Ken Russell's Tommy. Baird worked with Russell on five major motion pictures. He edited Tommy,  Lisztomania, and Valentino and served as associate producer on Ken Russell's Altered States. He also worked as assistant editor on Russell's The Devils, (1971).

After his Oscar-nominated work on Gorillas in the Mist in 1988 and his work with Richard Donner on Lethal Weapon 2, he accepted a position as full-time staff editor at Warner Bros. in 1989. With Warner Bros., he supervised the editing on such films as Die Hard 2 (1990) and Robin Hood: Prince of Thieves (1991).

The first two movies Baird directed were studio pictures produced and distributed by Warner Bros.; where he had served as Editor Supervisor. He has directed three films: Executive Decision (1996), U.S. Marshals (1998), and Star Trek: Nemesis (2002). He was the editor and executive producer of Lara Croft: Tomb Raider (2001). Baird edited the Columbia Pictures thriller Vantage Point.

In the film Star Trek: Nemesis, Baird also voiced the Scimitar computer. To get the job directing Star Trek: Nemesis, Baird performed re-cuts on Lara Croft: Tomb Raider and Mission: Impossible 2 for Paramount Pictures. Jerry Goldsmith was the composer for all of the Baird directed films.

Works

Editing credits
The Devils (1971) (as assistant Film editor)
Tommy (1975)
Lisztomania (1975)
The Omen (1976)
Superman (1978)
Valentino (1977)
Outland (1981)
Five Days One Summer (1982)
The Honorary Consul (1983)
Revolution (1985)
Ladyhawke (1985) (also second unit director)
Lethal Weapon (1987)
Gorillas in the Mist (1988)
Tango & Cash (1989) (supervising)
Lethal Weapon 2 (1989)
Die Hard 2 (1990)
The Last Boy Scout (1991)
Radio Flyer (1992)
Demolition Man (1993)
Maverick (1994)
Executive Decision (1996) (co-edited, also director)
Star Trek: Nemesis (2002) (co-edited, also director)
The Legend of Zorro (2005)
Superman II: The Richard Donner Cut (2006)
Casino Royale (2006)
Vantage Point (2008)
Whiteout (2009)
Edge of Darkness (2010)
Salt (2010)
Green Lantern (2011)
Skyfall (2012)
Bitter Harvest (2017) 
Tomb Raider (2018)
 Across the River and into the Trees (2021)

Directing credits
Executive Decision (1996)
U.S. Marshals (1998)
Star Trek: Nemesis (2002)

Production credits
If.... (1968) as Assistant to the director
Altered States (1980) as Associate Producer
Ladyhawke (1985) as 2nd unit director
Scrooged (1988) as Post-production consultant
Robin Hood: Prince of Thieves (1991) as project consultant
Lara Croft: Tomb Raider (2001) as executive producer
Bitter Harvest (2017) as producer

Television work
Split Personality (1992), a Joel Silver directed episode of the HBO horror anthology, Tales from the Crypt.

Accolades
Academy Awards
 1978: Academy Award for Best Film Editing — Superman (nominated)
 1988: Academy Award for Best Film Editing — Gorillas in the Mist: The Story of Dian Fossey (nominated)

American Cinema Editors
 Baird has been elected to membership in the American Cinema Editors.
 1978: Eddie Award for Best Edited Feature Film — Superman (nominated)
 2006: Eddie Award for Best Edited Feature Film – Dramatic — Casino Royale (nominated)
 2012: Eddie Award for Best Edited Feature Film – Dramatic — Skyfall (nominated)

British Academy Film Awards
 2006: BAFTA Award for Film Award Best Editing — Casino Royale (nominated)
 2012: BAFTA Award for Film Award Best Editing — Skyfall (nominated)

See also
List of film director and editor collaborations

References

External links
 
 
 

1947 births
Action film directors
British film editors
English film directors
English film editors
English film producers
Living people
Science fiction film directors